Alexander McGeoch (10 March 1854 – 24 January 1922) was a Scottish footballer who played for Glasgow Western, Dumbreck and Scotland. A  goalkeeper, he was the only serving Dumbreck player to have been selected for international duty. McGeoch also played cricket and rugby union (representing the West of Scotland club in both sports); in his professional life he was a company director at a brass hardware firm in England, and in 1920 was awarded an OBE for services relating to work in relation to the First World War.

References

Sources

External links

London Hearts profile

1854 births
1922 deaths
Association football goalkeepers
Dumbreck F.C. players
West of Scotland FC players
Scotland international footballers
Scottish footballers
People from Partick
Footballers from Glasgow
Officers of the Order of the British Empire
Scottish rugby union players
Scottish businesspeople